Paul Anthony Garlick (born 21 September 1968) is a former Australian cricketer. Garlick was a left-handed batsman who bowled Leg break googly.

Garlick represented Victoria in a single first-class against Tasmania. Garlick scored 8 runs and bowled 11 wicketless overs in the match. This was Garlicks only representative appearance for Victoria.

See also
 List of Victoria first-class cricketers

External links
Paul Garlick at Cricinfo
Paul Garlick at CricketArchive

1968 births
Living people
Australian cricketers
Victoria cricketers
Melbourne Cricket Club cricketers
Cricketers from Melbourne